Foundation is a science fiction novel by American writer Isaac Asimov. It is the first  published in his  Foundation Trilogy (later expanded into the Foundation series). Foundation is a cycle of five interrelated short stories, first published as a single book by Gnome Press in 1951. Collectively they tell the early story of the Foundation, an institute founded by psychohistorian Hari Seldon to preserve the best of galactic civilization after the collapse of the Galactic Empire.

Origin and early publication history
Four of the five stories had been earlier published in Astounding Science Fiction between 1942 and 1944 under different titles. A fifth part, the first in fictional chronology, was added for the 1951 Gnome Press edition.  The original four stories also appeared in 1955 as part of Ace's double novel series as D-110 under the title The 1,000-Year Plan.

Two further books, each consisting of two novellas, were published shortly after and the three are considered a trilogy. Much later Asimov wrote two sequels and two prequels to the trilogy. Later writers have written new additions authorized by Asimov's estate. 

The Foundation Series is often regarded as one of Isaac Asimov's best works, alongside his Robot series.

Background
On August 1st, 1941 Isaac Asimov proposed to John W. Campbell of Astounding Science Fiction that he write a short story set in a slowly declining Galactic Empire, based on the fall of the Western Roman Empire. Campbell liked the idea, and by the end of a two-hour meeting Asimov planned to write a series of stories depicting the fall of the first Galactic Empire and the rise of the second. Asimov submitted the first "Foundation" story on September 8th, Campbell purchased it on September 15th, and Astounding published it in May 1942. Asimov wrote seven more stories over eight years, and they were collected into The Foundation Trilogy. Published from 1951 to 1953, the three books became Asimov's most popular science fiction and won a Hugo Award for Best All-Time Series in 1966.

Plot summary

"The Psychohistorians"
This part is original to the 1951 book version. It takes place in 12,067 G.E. ("Galactic Era"). The story begins on Trantor, the capital of the 12,000-year-old Galactic Empire, powerful but slowly decaying. Hari Seldon, a mathematician and psychologist, has developed psychohistory, a new field of science and psychology that treats all possibilities in large societies by mathematics, allowing for the probabilistic prediction of future events.

By means of psychohistory, Seldon has discovered the decline and eventual fall of the Empire, angering the aristocratic members of the Commission of Public Safety, the de facto rulers of the Empire. The Commission considers Seldon's views and statements treasonous, and he is arrested along with the young mathematician Gaal Dornick, who has arrived on Trantor to join Seldon's group. Seldon is tried by the Commission; he defends his beliefs, explaining his theories and predictions, including his belief that the Empire will collapse in 300 years and while a Second Empire will eventually rise it will only come after a 30,000-year dark age.  He informs the Commission that an alternative to this future is attainable and explains to them that creating a compendium of all human knowledge, the Encyclopedia Galactica, may not prevent the inevitable fall of the Empire but would reduce the dark age to one millennium.

The skeptical Commission, not wanting to make Seldon a martyr, offers him exile to a remote world, Terminus, with others who could help him create the Encyclopedia. He accepts their offer, prepares for the departure of the "Encyclopedists" and receives an imperial decree officially acknowledging his actions. Seldon informs Dornick that, despite the Empire's belief it won by exiling Seldon, the outcome was exactly what he had intended and hoped for. Terminus would be the home of the first Foundation while a second would be established "at Star's End." Seldon then reveals that he is dying, and implores Dornick to become a leader in the new Foundation.

"The Encyclopedists"
"The Encyclopedists" was originally published in the May 1942 issue of Astounding Science-Fiction under the title of "Foundation". The story begins in 50 F.E. ("Foundation Era") on Terminus, which has almost no mineral resources. There is one region suitable for the development of a large city, named Terminus City. The colony of professionals, devoted to the creation of the Encyclopedia Galactica, is managed by the Board of Trustees of the Encyclopedia Galactica Foundation, composed solely of scientists, called the Encyclopedists. The affairs of Terminus City itself are handled by the city's first Mayor, Salvor Hardin, who is a political figurehead and virtually powerless due to the influence of the Board of Trustees. However, Hardin refuses to accept the status quo, which he believes puts Terminus in danger of political exploitation by the four neighboring prefectures of the Empire, which have declared independence and severed contact with its capital, Trantor, and are now calling themselves "The Four Kingdoms." Hardin manages to avoid an attempt by the Kingdom of Anacreon to establish military bases on Terminus and to take advantage of their nuclear power, which Terminus retains but which the Four Kingdoms do not. Hardin succeeds in diverting Anacreon from its initial goal and furthers his goal of the establishment of a stable political system on Terminus.

Hardin's efforts are still resisted by the Board of Trustees and its chairman, Dr. Lewis Pirenne, who erroneously believe they are protected by imperial decree. To remove this obstacle, Hardin and his chief advisor, Yohan Lee, plan a "coup d'état" designed to remove the Board of Trustees from its politically powerful position on the same day that, in the city's Time Vault, a holographic recording of Hari Seldon is programmed to play. The recording will contain psychohistoric proof of Hardin's success or failure; Hardin realizes that his coup is a great gamble due to the possible case that his beliefs are incompatible with Seldon's original goals.

The next day in the Time Vault the holographic recording of Hari Seldon appears. He reveals that the Encyclopedia Galactica is actually a distraction intended to make the colony's creation possible. The true purpose of the Foundation is to form one nucleus of a Second Galactic Empire and shorten the predicted period of chaos to a mere thousand years, rather than thirty thousand years.

After the recording ends, the Encyclopedists admit to Hardin that they had been wrong, and Pirenne schedules a meeting to discuss their next action. Hardin knew that this victory would give him the leverage he needed to gain significant power and thus "assume actual government" by removing the "figurehead" status from his Mayoral office. He also knew that Anacreon's forces would be arriving soon to forcibly take the Foundation. Salvor Hardin had guessed the solution, and as Hari Seldon said, "it was obvious."

"The Mayors"
"The Mayors" was originally published in the June 1942 issue of Astounding Science-Fiction as "Bridle and Saddle" (referring to Aesop's fable "The Horse that Lost its Liberty", a variant of which is recited by Hardin during the climax of the story). Following Seldon's first holographic recording, Salvor Hardin visits the other three kingdoms and convinces them not to allow Anacreon to gain sole possession of the Foundation's scientific advances, thereby driving off Anacreon from the planet Terminus. By 80 F.E., the Foundation's scientific understanding has given it significant leverage over the Four Kingdoms, though it is still isolated from the Galactic Empire. Exercising its control over the region through an artificial religion – Scientism – the Foundation shares its technology with the Four Kingdoms while referring to it as religious truth. Maintenance technicians comprise Scientism's priesthood, trained on Terminus. A majority of the priests themselves are unaware of the true importance of their "religion," referring to advanced technology as "holy" artifacts and tools. The religion is not suppressed by the secular elite of the Four Kingdoms, reminiscent of Western European rulers of the early medieval period, who use it to consolidate their power over the zealous populaces.

Hardin, as Mayor of Terminus City, is the effective ruler of the Foundation, and has been reelected as mayor continuously since his political victory over the Encyclopedia Galactica Board of Trustees. However, his influence is suddenly checked by a new political movement led by city councillor Sef Sermak, which encourages direct action against the Four Kingdoms and a cessation of the scientific proselytizing encouraged by Hardin's administration.  The movement, which calls itself "The Actionist Party" and whose followers refer to themselves as Actionists, is wildly popular, and Sermak and his fellow Actionist leaders refuse to respond to Hardin's efforts to appease them.

The kingdom that is most concerning to the Actionists is that of Anacreon, ruled by Prince Regent Wienis and his nephew, the teenaged King Lepold I. Wienis plans to overthrow the Foundation's power by launching a direct military assault against Terminus, making use of an abandoned Imperial battlecruiser redesigned by Foundation experts to fit the needs of the elite Anacreonian navy. However, Hardin orders a few minor modifications to be incorporated into the ship's design prior to its completion.

Wienis plans to launch his offensive on the night of his nephew's coronation as king and sole ruler of Anacreon. Hardin attends the coronation ceremony and is arrested, but he has already arranged with Anacreonian High Priest Poly Verisof, who is aware of the true nature of Scientism and is also Terminus's Ambassador to Anacreon, to foster a popular uprising against Wienis. Convincing the Anacreonian populace that an assault against the Foundation and Terminus is blasphemous, Verisof leads an infuriated mob to the royal palace and surrounds it, demanding Hardin's release. Meanwhile, one of Hardin's modifications to the battlecruiser shows itself; an ultrawave relay, a remote kill-switch to the ship's systems. The priest-attendant of the ship, Theo Aporat, presents the relay's activation as a divine curse, and the crew, convinced of the Foundation's god's power, mutinies against its commander, Admiral Prince Lefkin, Wienis's son. Lefkin confronts the mutineers and, captured, is forced to broadcast a message to Anacreon.  The message demands Wienis's arrest and trial before an ecclesiastical court, and threatens a bombardment of the royal palace if that and other demands are not met. Wienis, maddened by his failure, orders Hardin's execution, but his royal guardsmen refuse to obey him. Attempting and failing, due to a protective energy field, to kill Hardin personally, Wienis dies by suicide.

Hardin is proven correct again upon his return to Terminus City by another Seldon recording, set to play at this date. Though Actionists continue to hold a significant amount of power, enough now to control the City Council, an attempt to impeach the Mayor has already failed, and his popularity is renewed among the city's residents. It is also confirmed by Hari Seldon that the Foundation's immediate neighbors, the Four Kingdoms, will now be virtually powerless and incapable of resisting Scientism's advance. However, the growing nationalism of the fractured Periphery makes it hard for religion to make further conquests.

"The Traders"
"The Traders" was originally published in the October 1944 issue of Astounding Science-Fiction as "The Wedge". Circa 135 F.E., the Foundation has expanded and has sent out officially sanctioned Traders to exchange technology with neighboring planets for what amounts to greater political and economic power.  Master Trader Eskel Gorov, also an agent of the Foundation government, has travelled to the worlds of Askone, where he hopes to trade atomics.  Gorov, however, is met with resistance by Askone's governing Elders due to traditional taboos that effectively ban advanced technology.  Gorov is imprisoned and sentenced to death; the Elders refuse Foundation requests for clemency.

Trader Limmar Ponyets is ordered by the Foundation to try to negotiate with the Elders, and travels to the central Askonian planet.  Ponyets meets with the Elders' Grand Master and deduces that, though he is determined to have Gorov executed, he may be willing to exchange the captive for a suitable bribe, which Ponyets realizes would be a sum of gold.  Ponyets clumsily fashions a transmuter that will convert iron into gold.  The Grand Master informs Ponyets that others who have attempted this have failed and have been punished with execution for both their attempt and for their failure; Ponyets succeeds and convinces the Grand Master that the gold is appropriate for Askonian religious decoration, which pleases the Elders.

Councilor Pherl, the Grand Master's protégé, appears to be wary of Ponyets.  Meeting with the Councilor, Ponyets discovers that Pherl is instead quite willing to work with him, if only due to the chance of eventually attaining the Grand Mastership himself.  Pherl, from a different ethnic background than traditional Grand Masters and a young man, believes that a stable supply of gold will be able to dramatically increase his power, and Ponyets sells him the transmuter. He also plants a video recorder inside and blackmails him with a recording of the transmuter's use.

Gorov is released quickly. According to a new agreement, he and Ponyets can take as much tin from Pherl's mines as they can carry. Ponyets discusses his success with Gorov, explaining that now Pherl will become the new Grand Master - and one very much interested in selling Foundation goods, since Ponyets left all his cargo with him, and making people buy it is the only way for Pherl to salvage some of his pride. Gorov criticizes his technique due to what he perceives as Ponyets's lack of morality.  Ponyets replies by reminding Gorov of a statement attributed to Salvor Hardin: "Never let your sense of morals prevent you from doing what is right!"

"The Merchant Princes"
"The Merchant Princes" was first published in the August 1944 issue of Astounding Science-Fiction as "The Big and the Little".

Circa 155 F.E., the Foundation has subjugated the neighboring Four Kingdoms and tries expanding  its religious empire. However, due to rumors of the subjugation of the Four Kingdoms and, later, Askone, further expansion faces heavy resistance. Recently, three Foundation vessels have vanished near the Republic of Korell, which is thus suspected of either independent technological development or buying smuggled Foundation goods. Master Trader Hober Mallow is assigned to deal with Korell and also to investigate their technological development and find the missing ships. Those who have assigned this mission to Mallow, Foreign Secretary Publis Manlio and Mayoral Secretary Jorane Sutt, believe that a Seldon Crisis is underway; they fear a nuclear conflict involving the Foundation.

Sutt and Manlio, wanting to weaken the strong Trader faction and suspecting Mallow of being connected to the smugglers, plant an agent, Jaim Twer, aboard Mallow's ship, the Far Star. After the Far Star lands in a remote location on Korell, the crew allows a Foundation missionary aboard, in violation of orders Mallow has given that no one board or leave without his permission.

Korellian law forbids Foundation missionaries to be on the planet under penalty of death. The crew determines that the Reverend Jord Parma of Anacreon (as he calls himself) had been captured by the Korellians but escaped before being killed. Rev. Parma is injured and apparently confused. Shortly after he has been let aboard the ship, an angry mob appears, demanding that the missionary be turned over to them as an escaped criminal. This rapid response by the Korellians in such a remote location arouses Mallow's suspicion: Where did Parma escape from? Why was there a mob seemingly already gathered in the middle of nowhere? Suspecting a set-up, rather than fight the mob, Mallow decides to turn the missionary over to them (and to certain death). Very soon after, Mallow is invited to meet Korell's authoritarian ruler, Commdor ("First Citizen Of The State") Asper Argo, which indicates that Mallow had passed a test. Argo appears friendly and welcomes Foundation technological gifts; however, he refuses to allow Foundation missionaries on Korell, which coincides with Mallow's own intentions.

Mallow offers the Commdor tools for heavy industry, believing that will allow him to visit a factory, where the advanced technology would be found if Korell has it. He sees no sign of it, but catches a glimpse of the ruler's guards' weapons - atomic handguns bearing the markings of the Galactic Empire. Mallow's discoveries lead him to believe that the Empire may be attempting to expand into the Periphery again and has been providing weapons to client states such as Korell. Leaving the Republic and his ship, he journeys alone to the planet Siwenna, which he believes may be the capital of an Imperial province. He finds Siwenna a desolate and sad place. He meets the impoverished patrician Onum Barr in the latter's crumbling mansion. Barr helps Mallow to understand the political situation.  He had served in the Imperial government on Siwenna decades earlier, before a series of ambitious viceroys who each dreamt of becoming Emperor. After the previous viceroy rebelled against the Emperor, Barr participated in a revolution that overthrew the viceroy. However, the Imperial fleet sent to remove the viceroy wanted to conquer a rebellious province even if it was no longer in rebellion, and began a massacre that claimed the lives of all but one of Barr's children. The new viceroy also plans a rebellion, but keeps a backup plan: fleeing into the Periphery and carving out a sizable realm there. He had secured a political alliance with Korell by marrying his daughter to Asper.

Mallow manages to tour a Siwennian power plant. He observes that the technicians can only maintain the plants, but cannot repair them, and that the nuclear generators are much bigger than those of Terminus. Both mean that the Empire cannot replace the goods Mallow sells to the Commdor. He also realizes that religion cannot make further conquests for the Foundation, but a commercial empire can.

A year after his return to Terminus, Mallow is tried for murder because he gave the Foundation missionary to the mob. However, he produces a recording revealing that the "missionary" was in fact a Korellian secret policeman. Acquitted, Mallow is received with delight by the population of Terminus, which (along with the wealth obtained by trading with Korell) all but ensures him the Mayor's seat in the elections scheduled to take place in the following year. Mallow has Sutt and Manlio arrested, suspecting them (rightly) of planning a coup with the aid of the Four Kingdoms' religious elements. As Mayor, Mallow soon faces tension with Korell, which declares war on the Foundation, using its Imperial flotilla to attack Foundation ships. But instead of counterattacking Mallow takes no action but for imposing an embargo on Korell, which collapses its economy due to its dependency on Foundation technology, thus forcing its surrender. 

Mallow's ally Ankor Jael points out that Mallow's actions have placed the Foundation on the path to plutocracy and wonders about the future. Mallow responds that the future is none of his concern, as Seldon has undoubtedly foreseen and prepared for it already, leaving the resolution of future crises to his successors.

Characters

"The Psychohistorians"
Hari Seldon, mathematician who develops psychohistory
Gaal Dornick, mathematician and Seldon's biographer
Jerril, an agent of the Commission of Public Safety who watches Gaal Dornick
Linge Chen, chief commissioner of public safety, and judge of Seldon's trial
Lors Avakim, the lawyer appointed to defend Gaal Dornick

"The Encyclopedists"
Salvor Hardin, First Mayor of Terminus 
Anselm haut Rodric, soldier and Envoy from Anacreon to Terminus
Bor Alurin, Trantorian psychologist who trained Salvor Hardin
Jord Fara, Member of the Board of Trustees of the Encyclopedia Committee
Lewis Pirenne, Chairman of the Board of Trustees of the Encyclopedia Committee
Lundin Crast, Member of the Board of Trustees of the Encyclopedia Committee
Lord Dorwin, Chancellor of the Empire
Tomaz Sutt, Member of the Board of Trustees of the Encyclopedia Committee
Yate Fulham, Member of the Board of Trustees of the Encyclopedia Committee
Yohan Lee, one of Salvor Hardin's advisors and friends.

"The Mayors"
Dokor Walto, Foundation Action Party activist
Jaim Orsy, Foundation Action Party activist
King Lepold I, King of Anacreon.
Lem Tarki, Foundation Action Party activist.
Levi Norast, Foundation Action Party activist.
Lewis Bort, Foundation Action Party activist
Prince Lefkin, Wienis's eldest son.
Prince Regent Wienis, Prince Regent of Anacreon, uncle of King Lepold I.
Poly Verisof, Foundation ambassador and High Priest on Anacreon.
Salvor Hardin, First Mayor of Terminus.
Sef Sermak, Terminus City Councilor.
Theo Aporat, head priest on Anacreon's flagship Wienis.
Yohan Lee, organizer of Salvor Hardin's coup and close confidante of Hardin.

"The Traders"
Eskel Gorov, Master Trader and Foundation agent sentenced to death on Askone
Limmar Ponyets, Master Trader, liberates Gorov in exchange for a transmuter.
Les Gorm, Master Trader and knows Linmar Ponyets from trading.

"The Merchant Princes"
Hober Mallow, Master Trader and first of the Merchant Princes.
Publis Manlio, Foreign Secretary of the Foundation.
Jorane Sutt, Secretary to the Mayor of the Foundation.
Jaim Twer, Foundation agent planted on Mallow's ship.

Reception
Reviewer Groff Conklin declared Foundation "a book of real intellectual entertainment and adventure." Boucher and McComas, however, found it "competent enough writing and thinking, if on the dull side." P. Schuyler Miller received the volume favorably, but noted that the "revision and inter-writing" of the component stories was "not quite so successful a job" as Asimov had managed with I, Robot. 

In 1966 the Foundation trilogy won the prestigious Hugo Award for Best All-Time Series. In 2018 the chapter "The Encyclopedists" won a retrospective 1943 Hugo Award for the Best Novelette of the preceding year.

In 2012, io9 included the book on its list of "10 Science Fiction Novels You Pretend to Have Read".

See also

The Foundation Series

References

External links
 
 
 "Foundation", "Bridle and Saddle", "The Wedge", and "The Big and the Little" on the Internet Archive

1951 American novels
1951 science fiction novels
Foundation universe books
Science fiction novels by Isaac Asimov
Works originally published in Analog Science Fiction and Fact
Religion in science fiction
Gnome Press books
Fictional suicides

sv:Stiftelseserien#Stiftelsen